Goodbye is the fourth and final album by British singer-songwriter duo Ben & Jason. It was released on 13 October 2003 on the independent label Setanta.

Track listing

"Mr. America" – 4:02
"A Star in Nobody's Picture" – 4:23
"You're the Reason" – 3:22
"Hollywood (The Story of a Domestic Explosion)" – 3:33
"$10 Miracle" – 4:13
"Orphans" – 3:37
"Sail on Heaven's Seas" – 4:35
"Window In / Window Out" – 5:20
"When to Laugh" – 3:28

Japanese edition bonus tracks
"Another Giant Step" – 2:58
"Air Guitar (Home Recording)" – 3:31

2003 albums
Ben & Jason albums
Setanta Records albums